Genişkənd is a village and municipality in the Saatly Rayon of Azerbaijan. It has a population of 557.

References

Populated places in Saatly District